Halil Jaganjac (born 22 June 1998) is a Croatian handball player who plays for Rhein-Neckar Löwen and the Croatian national team.

Career
Jaganjac was born in Rijeka to Bosnian parents. His father hails from Bosanski Petrovac, and his mother hails from Prusac near Donji Vakuf. He rose through the ranks of his home-town club MRK Kozala, starting his professional career with the club in 2014–15. In July 2016, Jaganjac was transferred to Paris Saint-Germain, signing a three-year contract with the club. In June 2017, Jaganjac was called up by Lino Červar to the Croatia national team.

Awards and accomplishments

Club
MRK Kozala
Croatian League (youth): 2015–16

Individual
RK Metalurg Skopje
SEHA League top scorer: 2017–18
Macedonian Cup top scorer: 2017–18

References

External links
Profile at PSGhand.fr

1998 births
Living people
Handball players from Rijeka
Croatian male handball players
Expatriate handball players
Croatian expatriate sportspeople in France
Croatian expatriate sportspeople in North Macedonia
Mediterranean Games medalists in handball
Mediterranean Games gold medalists for Croatia
Competitors at the 2018 Mediterranean Games

Bosniaks of Croatia
21st-century Croatian people